The Ministry of National Defense of the Czechoslovak Republic (MNO ČSR; later MNO ČSSR and MNO ČSFR) refers to the defence ministry which was responsible for defense of Czechoslovakia during its existence, from 1918 to 1992.

List of ministers

First Czechoslovak Republic (1918–1938)

Second Czechoslovak Republic (1938–1939)

Czechoslovak government-in-exile (1940–1945)

Third Czechoslovak Republic (1945–1948)

Czechoslovak Socialist Republic (1948–1989)

Czech and Slovak Federative Republic (1989–1992)

Ministry of National Defence troops, late 1980s 
The Ministry was located in Prague, but many directorates had installations outside the capital.

The details are based on the Czech Ministerstvo narodni obrany website, which lists all units of the Czechoslovak People's Army in existence between 1950 and 1990, with their location, subordination, equipment and changes over time.

 Main Missile Troops and Artillery Directorate
 Central Ammunition Depot in Týniště nad Orlicí
 6th Armament Base in Olomouc
 Ammunition Depot Hronsek
 Ammunition Depot Sklené
 Ammunition Depot Trenčín
 Ammunition Depot Poprad
 Military Repair Plant Moldava nad Bodvou
 Separate Ammunition Depot Moldava nad Bodvou
 Military Repair Plant Nováky
 Separate Ammunition Depot Nováky
 Main Political Department
 Political Military Academy in Bratislava
 Main Medical Department
 Main Military Transport Directorate
 150th Military Traffic Office in Čierna nad Tisou
 Main Construction and Accommodation Directorate
 1st Road Construction Brigade in Pardubice
 103rd Road Construction Battalion in Klecany
 104th Road Construction Battalion in Nepomuk
 107th Road Construction Battalion in Chrudim
 108th Road Construction Battalion in Prague
 109th Road Construction Battalion in Stará Boleslav
 112th Road Construction Battalion in České Budějovice
 113th Road Construction Battalion in Týn nad Vltavou
 115th Road Construction Battalion in Týn nad Vltavou
 116th Road Construction Battalion in Horažďovice
 2nd Road Construction Brigade in Bratislava
 101st Road Construction Battalion in Vyškov
 102nd Road Construction Battalion in Liptovský Mikuláš
 105th Road Construction Battalion in Bratislava
 106th Road Construction Battalion in Levice
 110th Road Construction Battalion in Zbraslav
 114th Road Construction Battalion in Levice
 Equipment Department
 Quartermaster Department
 Combat Training Department
 Educational Department
 Military Ground Forces University in Vyškov
 Military Air Forces University in Košice
 1st Air School Regiment in Přerov with MiG-21F-13 fighters
 1st Flight School Squadron
 2nd Flight School Squadron
 3rd Flight School Squadron
 4th Flight School Squadron
 28th Air Base Battalion
 11th Electronic Support Battalion
 2nd Air School Regiment in Košice with Aero L-29 Delfín and L-39 Albatros jet trainers
 1st Flight School Squadron
 2nd Flight School Squadron
 3rd Flight School Squadron
 4th Flight School Squadron
 20th Air Base Battalion
 4th Electronic Support Battalion
 3rd Air School Regiment in Piešťany with Mi-2 helicopters
 1st Flight School Squadron
 2nd Flight School Squadron
 3rd Air Base and Electronic Support Battalion
 Foreign Air Forces Training Center in Košice
 10th Military Air Forces Maintenance Center in Prešov
 Military Technical University in Liptovský Mikuláš
 Engineer Troops Department
 Repair Base 042 in Olomouc
 Fuel Distribution Department
 Chemical Troops Department
 NBC-detection Center in Hostivice
 Professional Sport Army Center DUKLA in Banská Bystrica
 Veterinary Service Section
 Military Veterinary Research and Training Institute in Košice
 Automobile Repair Plant Zlatovce in Trenčín
 Central Tank and Automobile Depot in Nitra

See also
Czechoslovak Army
Czechoslovak People's Army
Government Army (Bohemia and Moravia)
Ministry of Defence (Czech Republic)
Ministry of Defence (Slovakia)

Notes

External links
Ministers of Defense of Czechoslovakia 1918–1992
Gallery Ministry of Defence 

Defence Ministers of Czechoslovakia
Czechoslovakia
Military of Czechoslovakia
1918 establishments in Czechoslovakia
1992 disestablishments in Czechoslovakia